Agustín Obando (born 11 March 2000) is an Argentine professional footballer who plays as a left winger for Tigre on loan from Boca Juniors.

Club career
Obando started his career in the ranks of Boca Juniors, having joined their academy from Club Samuel W. Robinson in 2010. His breakthrough into senior football arrived during the 2018–19 campaign under Gustavo Alfaro, with the manager selecting Obando for his professional debut on 6 April 2019 for a Primera División fixture away at the Estadio José María Minella versus Aldosivi; he featured for seventy-six minutes.

In January 2022, Obando joined Tigre on a two-year loan deal.

International career
In 2017, Obando represented Argentina at the South American U-17 Championship in Chile. He won four caps at the tournament, as well as netting a goal in a 3–0 first stage victory over Peru. He also played for the U15s and had training experience with the U20s; while with the latter, he trained against the senior squad at the 2018 FIFA World Cup in Russia.

Career statistics
.

Honours
Boca Juniors
 Primera División: 2019–20

References

External links

2000 births
Living people
People from Monte Caseros
Argentine footballers
Argentina youth international footballers
Association football forwards
Argentine Primera División players
Boca Juniors footballers
Club Atlético Tigre footballers
Sportspeople from Corrientes Province